Gibbula tumida is a species of sea snail, a marine gastropod mollusk in the family Trochidae, the top snails.

Description
The size of the shell varies between 4 mm and 10 mm.
The small, narrowly umbilicate shell has an elevated conical shape. The color is whitish, variously strigate or maculated with brown, beneath white, unicolored or punctate with brown. The spire is elevated, somewhat turreted. The apex is acute. The sutures are impressed. The six whorls are convex, encircled by numerous, close fine striae. The periphery is obtusely angular. The base of the shell is slightly convex, and concentrically finely lirate. The sculpture is coarser than upon the upper surface. The large aperture is rounded-quadrate. The oblique columella is straightened and a little convex in the middle. The deep umbilicus is narrow, expanding and funnel-shaped at its opening.

This species is readily recognized by the form, the whorls being a little tumid just below the sutures, and the base of the aperture is usually a little emarginate.

Distribution
This species occurs in the North Atlantic Ocean and in the North Sea from Gibraltar to the Barentz Sea.

References

 Montagu G., 1803: Testacea Britannica, or natural history of British shells, marine, land and the fresh-water, including the most minute: systematically arranged and embellished with figures; Romsey. London pp. XXXVII + 606 + 16 pl
 Dillwyn L. W., 1817: A descriptive catalogue of Recent shells, arranged according to the Linnean method; London Vol. 1: pp. 580 + 5 pl. . Vol. 2: pp. 581–1092 + 29 pl
 Nordsieck F., 1982: Die europäischen Meeres-Gehäuseschnecken. 2. Auflage; Gustav Fischer, Stuttgart 539 pp., 38 pl.
 Gofas, S.; Le Renard, J.; Bouchet, P. (2001). Mollusca, in: Costello, M.J. et al. (Ed.) (2001). European register of marine species: a check-list of the marine species in Europe and a bibliography of guides to their identification. Collection Patrimoines Naturels, 50: pp. 180–213

External links
 

tumida
Gastropods described in 1803